Melanoptilia haemogastra is a moth of the family Pterophoridae. It is known from Peru.

The wingspan is about 15 mm.

External links

Platyptiliini
Moths described in 1926
Taxa named by Edward Meyrick
Moths of South America